Sušak (in Italian Sussak) is a part of the city of Rijeka in Croatia, where it composes the eastern part of the city, separated from the city center by the Rječina river, which in former times served as an international border. Notable features of Sušak include the public beaches at Pećina and Glavanovo, along with the Tower Center shopping mall.

History  
Under the Habsburg monarchy, Rijeka and the surrounding area technically belonged to the Hungarian half of the Monarchy. Sušak was a municipality separate from the city of Rijeka and since the nineteenth century it experienced faster urbanisation and population growth. In 1924, Rijeka belonged to the independent Free State of Fiume, which had been created four years earlier under the Treaty of Rapallo, but in the Treaty of Rome the Kingdom of Serbs, Croats, and Slovenes and Italy agreed to dissolve the free state. Instead Fiume was annexed to Italy as the Province of Fiume, and Sušak remained with the Kingdom of Serbs, Croats, and Slovenes (also called Yugoslavia), but with joint administration of the port facilities.

On 1 February 1948 elections for the City Councils in Rijeka were held, thus creating the foundations for joining Rijeka and Sušak. The town councils of Sušak and Rijeka proposed to the Presidium of the Croatian Parliament that the two towns were joined together, and on 10 February 1947, the Peace Agreement between the FNRJ and Italy in Paris 175 km2 internationally belonged to Yugoslavia and Croatia. On 12 February 1948, the first session of the NO Rijeka was held when Rijeka was established.

The football club in Sušak is NK Orijent.

In literature  
In her 1941 travel book, Black Lamb and Grey Falcon, Rebecca West dedicates a chapter to "Sushak" (sic). At the moment of the writing the city was a separate town from Fiume, as described above.  Of the border area, she writes, "There we found a town that has the quality of a dream, a bad headachy dream. ...And at places where no frontiers could possibly be, in the middle of a square, or on a bridge linking the parts of a quay, men in uniform step forward and demand passports..."

See also  
 Treaty of Nettuno

Citations  

Rijeka
Modruš-Rijeka County

he:סושאק